Escalante Butte is a  prominence adjacent the far eastern South Rim of the Grand Canyon, of Northern Arizona. Adjacent east is a lower elevation butte, Cardenas Butte. Both buttes, (and the South Rim), are part of the western drainage of north-trending Tanner Canyon into the Colorado River.

Geology – Escalante & Cardenas Buttes

Escalante Butte and Cardenas Butte lie upon the same Supai Group ridgeline. At the west, Escalante is separated by a ridge saddle (the drainage southeast into Upper Tanner Canyon). Escalante Butte prominence is a small, heavily eroded cliff and debris remainder of Coconino Sandstone, (on debris of Hermit Shale), on eroded ridges of the Supai Group. Its small spire is a surviving cliff-former unit of the Supai Group.

See also
 Geology of the Grand Canyon area
 Escalante Route
 Tanner Trail

Citations

External links

 Coconino Sandstone of summit, Mountainzone.com
 View of Escalante Butte, etc, Summitpost. (Choose Escalante Butte; also shows ridgeline with Cardenas Butte.)

Grand Canyon
Grand Canyon, South Rim
Grand Canyon National Park
Colorado Plateau
Buttes of Arizona
Landforms of Coconino County, Arizona
Mountains of Arizona
Mountains of Coconino County, Arizona
North American 1000 m summits